Gudachari 116 is a 1966 Indian Telugu-language spy film written by Aarudhra, and directed by M. Mallikarjuna Rao. The film stars Krishna, Jayalalitha, Rajanala and Mukkamala in pivotal roles. It is noted to be the first spy film in Telugu cinema.

Released on 11 August 1966, Gudachari 116 was a commercial success, spawning several unrelated sequels in the subsequent years, namely, James Bond 777 (1971), Agent Gopi (1978), Rahasya Gudachari (1981) and Gudachari 117 (1989). Gudachari 116 was a breakthrough for actress Jayalalithaa. The film was remade in Hindi as Farz (1967).

Plot
Secret Agent 116 named Gopi has been assigned the case of the homicide of a fellow secret agent (303) by the head of CID. 303 had found evidence that can help identify the perpetrators. During this investigation, Gopi  meets lovely Radha in a flight journey, and both end up falling in love with each other. The traitor responsible for the killing of agent 303 has gone to meet 303's sister Kamla and tells her that he is a CID inspector and investigating his brother's case, warning that her brother's killer may make an attempt on her pretending as his colleague and friend.

He elsewhere unsuccessfully continued on the life of agent 116. 116 goes to meet Kamla and sees 303's portrait and notes down the studio photographer's name, but Kamla is convinced that 116 is the killer of her brother. Kamla is approached by another mafia don, Damodar, for her help in eliminating 116, to which she agrees. Damodar turns out to be Radha's father, when Radha introduces him, Gopi gets suspicious about him and commences a background check, which reveals that her father is a gangster.

As he sets out his case against Damodar, he continues his romance with Radha. During Radha's birthday party, Damodar directs his henchman to kill 116, who escapes after some car chase. 116 hesitantly reveals to Radha that her father is a gangster. Heartbroken, Radha confronts her father, who tells her that he was forced into his life of crime and terrorism, and some other person controls them all, which was overheard by 116 and his assistant, who are hiding outside. 116 goes out for his search for the real culprit to a skyscraper apartment where Kamla was plotted. Kamla seductively dances and mixes some intoxicant pill in his drink, which overlooked by 116, eventually made him senseless.

Goons take him to their secret den in the city outskirts, along with Radha, who mistakes them as Hospital Ward boys. In the den, 116 captures one of the goon leaders and forces him to reveal some information. 116 fights his way with Radha and escapes in a vehicle. In the meantime, CID agents trace a letter leading to clues regarding the Chinese conspiracy to destabilize the nation and accommodated by traitors inside, led by a person wearing a Mao uniform named Supremo, who only speaks a few broken English sentences. The rest of the movie follows 116's efforts to thwart a foreign conspiracy against India.

Cast

Soundtrack
There are 6 songs in the film.
 "Chempameeda Chitikeste Sompulanni" (Lyrics: Arudra; Singer: Ghantasala)
 "Manasuteera Navvule Navvule Navvali" (Lyrics: Arudra; Singers: Ghantasala, P. Susheela and group)
 "Neetho Yedo Paniundi" (Lyrics: Arudra; Singer: P. Susheela)
 "Nuvvu Naa Mundunte Ninnalaa Choostunte" (Lyrics: C. Narayana Reddy; Singers: Ghantasala and P. Susheela)
 "O Vaalu Choopula Vanneladi" (Lyrics: Arudra; Singer: Ghantasala)
 "Padileche Keratam Choodu" (Lyrics: Arudra; Singer: P. Susheela)
 "Yerra Buggala Meeda Manasaite" (Lyrics: C. Narayana Reddy; Singers: Ghantasala, P. Susheela and group)

References

External links

1966 films
1960s spy thriller films
Indian spy thriller films
Indian black-and-white films
Films about intelligence agencies
Telugu films remade in other languages
Films scored by T. Chalapathi Rao
1960s Telugu-language films